Comet Crommelin, also known as Comet Pons-Coggia-Winnecke-Forbes, is a periodic comet with an orbital period of almost 28 years. It fits the classical definition of a Halley-type comet with (20 years < period < 200 years). It is named after the British astronomer Andrew C. D. Crommelin who calculated its orbit in 1930. It is one of only four comets not named after their discoverer(s), the other three being Comets Halley, Encke, and Lexell. It next comes to perihelion (closest approach to the Sun) in late May/early June 2039.

The first observation was by Jean-Louis Pons (Marseille, France) on February 23, 1818, he followed the comet until February 27 but was prevented further by bad weather. Johann Franz Encke attempted to calculate the orbit but was left with very large errors.

In 1872, John R. Hind produced a rough orbital calculation and observed it was close to that of Comet Biela, based on these observations, Edmund Weiss later speculated it may have been part of Biela's comet.

The next observation was on November 10, 1873, by Jérôme E. Coggia (Marseille, France), and again on November 11 by Friedrich A. T. Winnecke (Strasbourg, France), but it was lost by November 16. Weiss and Hind took up the calculations and tried to match it again with the 1818 appearance.

A third discovery was by Alexander F. I. Forbes (Cape Town, South Africa) on November 19, 1928, and confirmed by Harry E. Wood (Union Observatory, South Africa) on November 21. It was Crommelin who eventually established the orbit and finally linked the 1818 (Pons) and 1873 (Coggia-Winnecke) comets to it (also see Lost comet).

On its latest return, 27P/Crommelin was recovered on May 12, 2011, at apparent magnitude 18.7 and peaked at magnitude 10.7 at perihelion on August 3.

References

External links 
Orbital simulation from JPL (Java) / Horizons Ephemeris
 27P/Crommelin at the Minor Planet Center's Database
 27P at Kronk's Cometography
 27P at Kazuo Kinoshita's Comets
 27P at Seiichi Yoshida's Comet Catalog
 27P at Earthrise Institute
 Lightcurve (Artyom Novichonok)
 27P as seen by 10" GRAS-04 on 2011-05-30 (60 sec x 8)
 27P as seen by 20" RCOS on 2011-07-10  (30 sec x 12; Joseph Brimacombe)

Periodic comets
Halley-type comets
0027
027P
Comets in 2011
18180223